Günther Pohl (born 23 August 1939 in Berlin, Germany) is a German longdistance- and ultra/marathon runner.

Achievements

Cup-Results

External links 
 DUV Deutsche Ultramarathon Vereinigung Results
 European Ultramarathon Cup Results
 Klassiker-Cup Results
 Erfurter Laufcup Results
 Saale-Cup Results
 100 km-Cup Results

Living people
1939 births
German male long-distance runners
German male marathon runners
German ultramarathon runners
Male ultramarathon runners
20th-century German people
21st-century German people